The girls' 3x3 mixed ice hockey tournament at the 2020 Winter Youth Olympics was held from 10 to 15 January at the Vaudoise Aréna in Lausanne, Switzerland.

Teams

Preliminary round

All times are local (UTC+1).

Playoff round

Bracket

Semifinals

Bronze medal game

Gold medal game

References

External links

Women's Mixed NOC 3-on-3  

Girls' 3x3 mixed tournament